The Vernon J. Ehlers Station is a train station in Grand Rapids, Michigan, United States served by Amtrak, the U.S. national railroad passenger system. The station is the terminus of the Pere Marquette line that connects Chicago's Union Station to Grand Rapids. It opened at its new location on Century Avenue under the Wealthy Street/US Highway 131 overpass, immediately south of The Rapid's Central Station. It is named in honor of then-Congressman Vernon J. Ehlers.

The new central location allows easy connections to twenty local Rapid buses as well as Greyhound and Indian Trails intercity services. No plans have been announced yet to move Megabus services from their location opposite the old Amtrak station at Wealthy/Market to complete the multimodal transit hub.

History

The earlier Union Station (1900) was demolished, 1958–1959, to make way for US Highway 131 expansion into a freeway. Several companies ran passenger trains through the station: New York Central Railroad, Pennsylvania Railroad and Pere Marquette Railway later assumed by the Chesapeake & Ohio Railroad.

The previous Amtrak station opened in 1984 at the corner of Wealthy Street and Market Avenue in downtown Grand Rapids.

In October 2011, groundbreaking occurred on the new station. It is named in honor of former Michigan Congressman Vern Ehlers. The new station enables fully intermodal transit while allowing for more efficient train turnarounds.  It was funded by a US$3.8 million grant from the Federal Railroad Administration and $850,000 from the City of Grand Rapids.

Due to delays in construction from CSX and the City of Grand Rapids, the station construction started in the summer of 2013. The new station opened on October 27, 2014.

Like its predecessor, the station has no checked baggage service, and is open one hour before trains arrive. However, a Quik-Trak kiosk is available. A Thruway Motorcoach route runs between this station and Kalamazoo to connect with the Wolverine.

Transit connections
Central Station lies a short distance north of the new Amtrak station.

References

External links

Grand Rapids Station (Michigan Passenger Stations)
Grand Rapids Amtrak Station (USA Rail Guide -- Train Web)

Amtrak stations in Michigan
Railway stations in the United States opened in 1984
Transportation in Grand Rapids, Michigan
Buildings and structures in Grand Rapids, Michigan
Transportation buildings and structures in Kent County, Michigan